The burial of Jesus refers to the entombment of the body of Jesus after crucifixion, before the eve of the sabbath described in the New Testament. In art, it is often called the Entombment of Christ.

Biblical accounts 

The earliest reference to a burial of Jesus is in a letter of Paul. Writing to the Corinthians around the year 54 AD, he refers to the account he had received of the death and resurrection of Jesus ("and that he was buried, and that he was raised on the third day according to the Scriptures").

The four canonical gospels, written between 66 and 95, conclude with an extended narrative of Jesus' arrest, trial, crucifixion, entombment, and resurrection. They narrate how, on the evening of the Crucifixion, Joseph of Arimathea asked Pilate for the body, and, after Pilate granted his request, he wrapped it in a linen cloth and laid it in a tomb.

Modern scholarship emphasizes contrasting the gospel accounts, and finds the Mark portrayal more probable.

Gospel of Mark 
In the Gospel of Mark (the earliest of the canonical gospels), written around the years 66 and 72, Joseph of Arimathea is a member of the Sanhedrin, which had condemned Jesus, who wishes to ensure that the corpse is buried in accordance with Jewish Law, according to which dead bodies could not be left exposed overnight. He puts the body in a new shroud and lays it in a tomb carved into the rock. The Jewish historian Josephus, writing later in the century, described how the Jews regarded this law as so important that even the bodies of crucified criminals would be taken down and buried before sunset. In this account, Joseph does only the bare minimum to observe the Law, wrapping the body in a cloth, with no mention of washing (Taharah) or anointing it. This may explain why Mark mentions an event prior to the crucifixion in which a woman pours perfume over Jesus. Jesus is thereby prepared for burial even before his actual death.

Gospel of Matthew 
The Gospel of Matthew was written around the years 80 to 85, using the Gospel of Mark as a source. In this account Joseph of Arimathea is not referenced as a member of the Sanhedrin, but a wealthy disciple of Jesus. Many interpreters have read this as a subtle orientation by the author towards wealthy supporters, while others believe this is a fulfillment of prophecy from Isaiah 53:9: "And they made his grave with the wicked, And with the rich his tomb; Although he had done no violence, Neither was any deceit in his mouth." This version suggests a more honourable burial: Joseph wraps the body in a clean shroud and places it in his own tomb, and the word used is soma (body) rather than ptoma (corpse). The author adds that the Roman authorities "made the tomb secure by putting a seal on the stone and posting the guard."

Gospel of Luke 
The Gospel of Mark is also a source for the account given in the Gospel of Luke, written around the year 90–95. As in the Markan version, Joseph is described as a member of the Sanhedrin, but as not having agreed with the Sanhedrin's decision regarding Jesus; he is said to have been "waiting for the kingdom of God" rather than a disciple of Jesus.

Gospel of John 
The Gospel of John, the last of the gospels, was written around the years 80 to 90, and it depicts Joseph as a disciple who gives Jesus an honourable burial. John says that Joseph was assisted in the burial process by Nicodemus, who brought a mixture of myrrh and aloes and included these spices in the burial cloth according to Jewish customs.

Comparison 
The comparison below is based on the New International Version.

In non-canonical literature 
The apocryphal manuscript known as the Gospel of Peter states that the Jews handed over the body of Jesus to Joseph, who later washes him then buries him in a place called "Joseph's Garden".

Historicity 

Scholars differ on the historicity of the burial story, and the question if Jesus received a decent burial. Points of contention are if Jesus' body was taken off the cross before sunset, or left on the cross to decay; if his body was taken off the cross and buried specifically by Joseph of Arimathea, or by the Sanhedrin or a group of Jews in general; and if he was entombed, and if so, what kind of tomb, or if he was buried in a common grave. 

An argument in favor of a decent burial before sunset is the Jewish custom, based on the Torah, that the body of an executed person should not remain on the tree where the corpse was hung for public display, but be buried before sunrise. Reference is also made to the Digesta, a Roman Law Code from the 6th century AD, which contains material from the 2nd century AD stating that "the bodies of those who have been punished are only buried when this has been requested and permission granted." Burial of people who were executed by crucifixion is also attested by archaeological finds from Yehohanan, of a body with a nail in the heel which could not be removed.

Martin Hengel argued that Jesus was buried in disgrace as an executed criminal who died a shameful death, a view which is "now widely accepted and has become entrenched in scholarly literature." John Dominic Crossan argued that Jesus followers did not know what happened to the body. According to Crossan, Joseph of Arimathea is "a total Markan creation in name, in place, and in function," arguing that Jesus' followers inferred from Deut. 21:22-23 that Jesus was buried by a group of law-abiding Jews, as described in Acts 13:29. This story was adapted by Mark, turning the group of Jews into a specific person. What really happened may be deduced from customary Roman practice, which was to leave the body on the stake, denying a honorable or family burial, famously stating that "the dogs were waiting."

British New Testament scholar Maurice Casey also notes that "Jewish criminals were supposed to receive a shameful and dishonourable burial," quoting Josephus:

Casey argues that Jesus was indeed buried by Joseph of Arimathea, but in a tomb for criminals owned by the Sanhedrin. He therefore rejects the empty tomb narrative as legendary.

New Testament historian Bart D. Ehrman also concludes that we don't know what happened to Jesus' body, but doubts that Jesus had a decent burial, and finds it doubtful that Jesus was buried by Joseph of Arimathea specifically. Ehrman notes that Acts 13 refers to the Sanhedrin as a whole putting Jesus' body in a tomb, not a single member. According to Ehrman, the story may have been embellished and become more detailed, and "what was originally a vague statement that the unnamed Jewish leaders buried Jesus becomes a story of one leader in particular, who is named, doing so." Ehrman gives three reasons for doubting a decent burial. He notes that "Sometimes Christian apologists argue that Jesus had to be taken off the cross before sunset on Friday because the next day was the Sabbath and it was against Jewish law, or at least Jewish sensitivities, to allow a person to remain on the cross during the Sabbath. Unfortunately, the historical record suggests just the opposite." Referring to Hengel and Crossan, Ehrman argues that crucifixion was meant "to torture and humiliate a person as fully as possible," and the body was normally left on the stake to be eaten by animals. Ehrman further argues that criminals were usually buried in common graves; and Pilate had no concern for Jewish sensitivities, which makes it unlikely that he would have allowed for Jesus to be buried. 

A number of Christian authors have rejected the criticisms, taking the Gospel-accounts to be historically reliable. John A.T. Robinson states that "the burial of Jesus in the tomb is one of the earliest and best-attested facts about Jesus." Dale Allison, reviewing the arguments of Crossan and Ehrman, finds this assertion to strong, but "find[s] it likely that a man named Joseph, probably a Sanhedrist, from the obscure Arimathea, sought and obtained permission from the Roman authorities to make arrangements for Jesus’ hurried burial." Raymond E. Brown, writing in 1973 before the publications of Hengel and Crossan, mentions that a number of authors have argued for a burial in a common grave, but argues that the body of Jesus was buried in a new tomb by Joseph of Arimathea in accordance with Mosaic Law, which stated that a person hanged on a tree must not be allowed to remain there at night, but should be buried before sundown. James Dunn dismisses the criticisms, stating that "the tradition is firm that Jesus was given a proper burial (Mark 15.42-47 pars.), and there are good reasons why its testimony should be respected." Dunn argues that the burial tradition is "one of the oldest pieces of tradition we have," referring to 1 Cor. 15.4; burial was in line with Jewish custom as prescribed by Deut. 21.22-23 and confirmed by Josephus War; cases of burial of crucified persons are known, as attested by the Yehohanan burial; Joseph of Arimathea "is a very plausible historical character"; and "the presence of the women at the cross and their involvement in Jesus' burial can be attributed more plausibly to early oral memory than to creative story-telling." N. T. Wright argues that the burial of Christ is part of the earliest gospel traditions. Craig A. Evans refers to Deut. 21:22-23 and Josephus, to argue that the entombment of Jesus accords with Jewish sensitivities and historical reality.

Theological significance 
Paul the Apostle includes the burial in his statement of the gospel in verses 3 and 4 of 1 Corinthians 15: "For I delivered unto you first of all that which I also received, how that Christ died for our sins according to the scriptures; And that he was buried, and that he rose again the third day according to the scriptures" (KJV). This appears to be an early pre-Pauline credal statement.

The burial of Christ is specifically mentioned in the Apostles' Creed, where it says that Jesus was "crucified, dead, and buried." The Heidelberg Catechism asks "Why was he buried?" and gives the answer "His burial testified that He had really died."

The Catechism of the Catholic Church states that, "It is the mystery of Holy Saturday, when Christ, lying in the tomb, reveals God's great sabbath rest after the fulfillment of man's salvation, which brings peace to the whole universe" and that "Christ's stay in the tomb constitutes the real link between his passible state before Easter and his glorious and risen state today."

Depiction in art 

The Entombment of Christ has been a popular subject in art, being developed in Western Europe in the 10th century. It appears in cycles of the Life of Christ, where it follows the Deposition of Christ or the Lamentation of Christ. Since the Renaissance, it has sometimes been combined or conflated with one of these.

Notable individual works with articles include:
The Entombment (Bouts, c. 1450s)
Lamentation of Christ (Rogier van der Weyden, c. 1460–1463)
The Entombment (Michelangelo, c. 1500–01)
The Deposition (Raphael, 1507)
The Entombment (Titian, 1525)
The Entombment (Titian, 1559)
The Entombment of Christ (Caravaggio, 1603–04)
Veiled Christ (Sanmartino, 1753)

Use in hymnody 
The African-American spiritual Were you there? has the line "Were you there when they laid Him in the tomb?" while the Christmas carol We Three Kings includes the verse:
Myrrh is mine, its bitter perfume
Breathes a life of gathering gloom;
Sorrowing, sighing, bleeding, dying,
Sealed in the stone cold tomb.
John Wilbur Chapman's hymn "One Day" interprets the burial of Christ by saying "Buried, He carried my sins far away."

In the Eastern Orthodox Church, the following troparion is sung on Holy Saturday:
The noble Joseph,
when he had taken down Thy most pure body from the tree,
wrapped it in fine linen and anointed it with spices,
and placed it in a new tomb.

Artistic depictions

See also 

 Tomb of Jesus, multiple sites purported to be Christ's burial place
 Descent from the Cross
 Empty tomb
 Epitaphios (liturgy)
 Life of Jesus in the New Testament
 Harrowing of Hell

Notes

References

Sources

 

 
 

 
 

 
 
 

 
 

 
 
 

 
 

 

 
Stations of the Cross
Seven Sorrows of Mary